Alfred Bryan may refer to:

 Alfred Bryan (illustrator) (1852–1899), English illustrator
 Alfred Bryan (lyricist) (1871–1958), Canadian lyricist

See also
 Alfred Ryan (1904–1990), Australian sportsman